Martha Schlamme (née 
Haftel; September 25, 1923 – October 6, 1985) was an Austrian-born American singer and actress.

She was born to an Orthodox Jewish family in Vienna, Austria in 1923. Her parents were Meier Haftel and Gisa Braten. Forced to flee to France in 1938 after the annexation of Austria by Nazi Germany, Haftel soon after joined her family in England, where they were then interned as 'enemy aliens' on the Isle of Man, where 
she made her acting debut, appearing in a German-language production of As You Like It. At the camp, she heard a concert of the Danish-Icelandic folk singer Engel Lund, and it was exposure to Lund's repertoire, which included traditional Yiddish songs, that inspired Haftel to pursue a musical career. Living in London after the war, she supported herself doing office work while studying voice and piano and occasionally performing on stage and radio.

Emigrating to the United States in 1948, Haftel married her first husband, Hans Schlamme. She supported herself performing an ever-increasing repertoire of folk songs in multiple languages in nightclubs and concert venues in the Catskills and elsewhere. Her early recorded work began during this period and was recorded in collaboration with the Israeli composer Nachum Nardi. 

In 1954, she recorded the album German Folk-Songs with the then-blacklisted singer Pete Seeger. Aside from this album for Folkways Records, she would later record for the Vanguard, Columbia and MGM labels.
In 1959, her album of songs composed by Kurt Weill at the Edinburgh Festival led to wider awareness of her work; she herself said it made her "a star overnight". MGM released her albums The World of Kurt Weill in Song in 1962 and A Kurt Weill Cabaret in 1963. 
The label further issued (Martha Schlamme says:) Kissin's No Sin in 1963.  

Among her stage performances were Weill's Mahagonny (Stratford Festival, Ontario, 1965), A Kurt Weill Cabaret (Ravinia Festival, 1967), Fiddler on the Roof (as Golde, Broadway, 1968) and several one-woman shows, including A Woman Without a Man Is....
Her television appearances as herself include the series Hootenanny (1963), Rainbow Quest (1965), Talk of the Town (1965) and the America's Musical Theater episode "Happy End" (1985). She also appeared in a small role in the 1980 television movie Playing for Time (as "Woman on train"). 

She continued to perform until her death in 1985, two months after suffering a stroke while onstage in Jamestown, New York. She was 62 years old.

References

Further reading 

1923 births
1985 deaths
20th-century Austrian women singers
Austrian folk singers
Musicians from Vienna
Austrian emigrants to the United States